Jacob H. Muckerheide was a member of the Wisconsin State Assembly.

Biography
Muckerheide was born in Wildeshausen, then in the Grand Duchy of Oldenburg. Sources have differed on the date. He died on October 9, 1885 in Kewaskum (town), Wisconsin.

Career
Muckerheide was a member of the Assembly in 1879. He was a Democrat.

References

People from Wildeshausen
People from the Grand Duchy of Oldenburg
People from Kewaskum, Wisconsin
Democratic Party members of the Wisconsin State Assembly
1885 deaths